Matthew Richard Quinn (born 28 February 1993) is a New Zealand born cricketer who plays for Kent County Cricket Club.

Quinn was born in New Zealand and played for Auckland, making his List A cricket debut in February 2013 in the 2012–13 Ford Trophy. At the end of 2015, he signed a three-year contract with Essex County Cricket Club. Quinn has a British passport so is not regarded as an overseas player. On 5 May 2021, Quinn joined Kent County Cricket Club on loan for their next four matches in the 2021 County Championship. On 16 June 2021, Quinn signed a three-year contract with Kent to start from 2022 and also rejoined on loan for the remainder of the 2021 season.

References

External links

1993 births
Living people
New Zealand cricketers
Auckland cricketers
Cricketers from Auckland
Essex cricketers
English cricketers
New Zealand emigrants to England
New Zealand expatriate sportspeople in England
Kent cricketers